Imam Azzan bin Qais was the Imam of Oman between 1868 and 1870. He deposed his distant relative Sayyid Salim bin Thuwaini. Opposing Saudi interference in the Buraimi Oasis, he fought against Salim's uncle, Sayyid Turki bin Said at the Battle of Dhank, before being killed in battle at Muttrah in 1871.

References 

1871 deaths
19th-century Arabs
Sultans of Oman
Year of birth unknown
Al Said dynasty
Assassinated Omani people
19th-century Omani people